Maria Thorisdottir (born 5 June 1993) is a Norwegian professional footballer who plays as a defender for Manchester United of the English Women's Super League and the Norway national team. Prior to fully focusing on football, she also played handball in the Eliteserien for Sola and Stabæk.

Club career

Klepp 
Thorisdottir began her career at Norwegian first division team Klepp IL. Originally a midfielder or striker within the Klepp youth system, she first transitioned to centre-back while with the youth national team. She made her senior debut as a 66th-minute substitute on 5 April 2010 in a 0–0 draw with Amazon Grimstad. She scored her first goal for the club on 29 August 2010, a 90th-minute consolation goal in a 3–1 defeat to Arna-Bjørnar.

In September 2012 Thorisdottir decided to retire from football due to injury, most notably citing her struggle with patellar tendinitis. During this spell she began playing handball, signing for Stabæk in June 2013.

In 2014, Thorisdottir made the decision to return to football and began training with Klepp again. Two years since her last appearance she made her comeback on 6 August 2014, starting in a 1–0 Norwegian Cup victory over Arna-Bjørnar. In August 2015 Thorisdottir was sidelined again, this time with a torn ankle ligament. Close to a return, Thorisdottir suffered a further setback when doctors picked up a rare and complicated issue with the foot that would be "potentially career-threatening" if left untreated. She underwent surgery in November 2015, keeping her out for the 2016 season.

A perpetual mid-table team during her tenure, Klepp earned their highest finish position in 12 seasons when Thorisdottir returned in 2017, ending the season in fourth-place in her final season with the club.

Chelsea 
In September 2017, Thorisdottir left Klepp to sign a two-year contract with English FA WSL team Chelsea. She made her first appearance for the club on 24 September 2017 in a 6–0 WSL win over Bristol City. In her first season with the club Thorisdottir made 10 league appearances as Chelsea won the 2017–18 FA WSL title. She also made three appearances in the FA Cup including as a substitute in the final as Chelsea beat Arsenal 3–1.

In her second season at Chelsea, Thorisdottir scored her first goal for the club on 12 September 2018 in a UEFA Champions League Round of 32 5–0 victory over SFK 2000 Sarajevo. In October 2018, she suffered a concussion during a game which kept her out until May 2019. In June 2019, she renewed her contract with Chelsea until the summer of 2021.

Manchester United 
On 22 January 2021, Thorisdottir signed for Manchester United from Chelsea on a two-and-a-half-year contract with an option to extend for a further year. Two weeks later, she made her debut in a 2–0 league defeat to Reading.

International career

Youth
Thorisdottir went through all Norwegian junior teams beginning in 2008 at under-15 level. She was part of the under-17 team during 2009 UEFA Women's Under-17 Championship qualification and was called up to the finals in Nyon, Switzerland where Norway finished in fourth place. A year later, she was again part of the under-17s as Norway proceeded to the second round of 2010 UEFA Women's Under-17 Championship qualification before losing out to Germany.

At under-19 level Thorisdottir was part of the team at the 2011 UEFA Women's Under-19 Championship, reaching the tournament final before losing 8–1 to Germany. The tournament also acted as qualification for the 2012 FIFA U-20 Women's World Cup, only the second time Norway had qualified. Thorisdottir was part of the squad in Japan, making three appearances as Norway reached the quarter-finals before meeting Germany again and losing 4–0. Following the tournament, Thorisdottir announced her retirement from football due to injuries. Having reignited her club career with Klepp, she made a return to international football three years later, receiving a call-up to the under-23 team for the La Manga U23 invitational against Japan and the United States in February 2015.

Senior
On 16 February 2015, Thorisdottir was called-up to the senior team for the first time  as part of the 2015 Algarve Cup squad. On 6 March 2015, just four days after appearing for the under-23 team in La Manga, Thorisdottir made her senior international debut starting in a 1–0 victory over Iceland. She had earlier been approached to play for Iceland but turned it down in the hope of making the Norwegian team. Despite this she described how special it was to debut against the country of her father's birth that she visited every summer to stay with her grandparents.

On 14 May 2015, she was named to the squad for the 2015 FIFA Women's World Cup. After sitting out the opening group game, she made her World Cup debut in a 1–1 draw with Germany. Norway progressed from the group stage before being eliminated by England in the Round of 16. Despite missing the entire qualification campaign with injuries, Thorisdottir was named in the squad for UEFA Women's Euro 2017. Having at least reached the semi-finals in the past four editions, Norway surprisingly crashed out bottom of the group having lost all three games, the first time they had failed to pick up any points at the tournament. Thorisdottir played the full 90 minutes in group games against both eventual finalist Denmark and Netherlands. In January 2018, she scored her first senior international goal in a 3–0 friendly win over Scotland. Having stayed fit enough to start all 8 of Norway's 2019 FIFA Women's World Cup qualification matches in which the team topped a group including the Netherlands, Thorisdottir was named to the final tournament squad in May 2019. She played every minute of all five of Norway's games in France before they were once again eliminated by England, this time at the quarter-final stage.

Personal life
Thorisdottir was born in Norway to a Norwegian mother and an Icelandic father, Þórir Hergeirsson, appointed coach of the Norway women's national handball team in 2009. Her father's extended family lives in Iceland.

During her childhood, she was part of a juggling group and performed with different companies.

Thorisdottir got a golden retriever called Theo in 2015 and has regularly commented on the positive impact owning a dog has had on her mental health, especially during the two-year spell she had battling frequent injuries.

Career statistics

Club

International

Scores and results list Norways's goal tally first, score column indicates score after each Thorisdottir goal.

Honours
Chelsea
FA Women's Super League: 2017–18, 2019–20
FA Cup: 2018
FA Women's League Cup: 2020
Community Shield: 2020

References

External links
 FIFA Player profile
 
 
 

1993 births
Living people
Sportspeople from Stavanger
Norwegian people of Icelandic descent
Norwegian women's footballers
Norway women's international footballers
Norwegian expatriate women's footballers
Women's association football defenders
Klepp IL players
Toppserien players
Chelsea F.C. Women players
Manchester United W.F.C. players
Women's Super League players
Norwegian expatriate sportspeople in England
Expatriate women's footballers in England
2015 FIFA Women's World Cup players
2019 FIFA Women's World Cup players
UEFA Women's Euro 2022 players
UEFA Women's Euro 2017 players